Brian Gilmore Maegraith (August 25, 1907 - April 2, 1989) (M.B., B.S., Adel., 1930, B.sc. D.Phil., Oxon 1934, M.A., Oxon., 1935) was born in Adelaide, South Australia, in 1907 and went to Britain in 1931 to take up the South Australian Rhodes Scholarship at Magdalen College, Oxford. He served in France and Sierra Leone as a pathologist in the Royal Army Medical Corps, led the Malaria Research Unit at Oxford, held the Deanship of Faculty of Medicine at Oxford, and was appointed to the Chair of Tropical Medicine at the Liverpool School of Tropical Medicine in 1944. He died in England in 1989.

References

External links
 

1907 births
1989 deaths
People from Adelaide
Australian tropical physicians
Alumni of Magdalen College, Oxford
Academics of the University of Liverpool
Australian pathologists
Fellows of Exeter College, Oxford
Australian expatriates in France
Australian expatriates in Sierra Leone
Presidents of the Royal Society of Tropical Medicine and Hygiene
Academics of the Liverpool School of Tropical Medicine